Dean Kemp (born 17 February 1969 in Kalgoorlie, Western Australia) is a former Australian rules footballer who played for the West Coast Eagles in the Australian Football League.

Recruited from Subiaco in the Western Australian Football League, Kemp made his AFL debut in Round 1 of the 1990 AFL season in a 46-point win at Subiaco Oval against eventual premiers Collingwood. He played 23 games (including all four finals) and won West Coast's Rookie of the Year Award.

In 1992 he played in West Coast's Premiership team and earned All-Australian selection as well as West Coast's best and fairest award. 
In 1994 he played in the side's second premiership team and won the Norm Smith Medal for best on ground.

He was selected in the 1996 Team of the Decade and the 2006 Team 20 for the Eagles. In 2001 he was made co-captain with Ben Cousins, but retired later that season. Kemp suffered numerous concussions during his career, including one resulting from a savage hit from Mark Ricciuto, and his career was ultimately shortened somewhat by the effects of these numerous concussions.

Kemp was an outstanding midfielder who surprisingly never polled well in the Brownlow Medal count, polling only 53 career votes, with a season best of 13 in 2000. A reason put forward for this is that Kemp was not a flashy ball carrier type player. Rather, on gaining possession of the ball, would quickly and effectively dispose of it to a teammate.

He was also particularly good playing in the wet, rarely fumbling the greasy ball. He enjoyed a successful career after he was drafted at number 117 in the 1989 draft. The lateness of his selection in the draft is frequently highlighted to argue that late draft picks can still prove themselves to be star players.

Kemp was inducted into the Australian Football Hall of Fame in 2007 and the Western Australian Football Hall of Fame in 2005.

Statistics

|-
|- style="background-color: #EAEAEA"
! scope="row" style="text-align:center" | 1990
|style="text-align:center;"|
| 33 || 23 || 4 || 4 || 262 || 179 || 441 || 75 || 46 || 0.2 || 0.2 || 11.4 || 7.8 || 19.2 || 3.3 || 2.0 || 0
|-
! scope="row" style="text-align:center" | 1991
|style="text-align:center;"|
| 2 || 23 || 12 || 9 || 259 || 170 || 429 || 61 || 46 || 0.5 || 0.4 || 11.3 || 7.4 || 18.7 || 2.7 || 2.0 || 3
|- style="background-color: #EAEAEA"
| scope=row bgcolor=F0E68C | 1992# || 
| 2 || 25 || 14 || 12 || 380 || 163 || 543 || 70 || 74 || 0.6 || 0.5 || 15.2 || 6.5 || 21.7 || 2.8 || 3.0 || 7
|-
! scope="row" style="text-align:center" | 1993
|style="text-align:center;"|
| 2 || 17 || 9 || 5 || 248 || 108 || 356 || 56 || 63 || 0.5 || 0.3 || 14.6 || 6.4 || 20.9 || 3.3 || 3.7 || 0
|- style="background-color: #EAEAEA"
| scope=row bgcolor=F0E68C | 1994# || 
| 2 || 22 || 19 || 14 || 304 || 163 || 467 || 80 || 44 || 0.9 || 0.6 || 13.8 || 7.4 || 21.2 || 3.6 || 2.0 || 5
|-
! scope="row" style="text-align:center" | 1995
|style="text-align:center;"|
| 2 || 23 || 16 || 10 || 267 || 196 || 463 || 74 || 69 || 0.7 || 0.4 || 11.6 || 8.5 || 20.1 || 3.2 || 3.0 || 3
|- style="background-color: #EAEAEA"
! scope="row" style="text-align:center" | 1996
|style="text-align:center;"|
| 2 || 21 || 12 || 12 || 274 || 168 || 442 || 73 || 70 || 0.6 || 0.6 || 13.0 || 8.0 || 21.0 || 3.5 || 3.3 || 8
|-
! scope="row" style="text-align:center" | 1997
|style="text-align:center;"|
| 2 || 22 || 13 || 7 || 296 || 192 || 488 || 69 || 63 || 0.6 || 0.3 || 13.5 || 8.7 || 22.2 || 3.1 || 2.9 || 7
|- style="background-color: #EAEAEA"
! scope="row" style="text-align:center" | 1998
|style="text-align:center;"|
| 2 || 17 || 6 || 6 || 200 || 142 || 342 || 40 || 40 || 0.4 || 0.4 || 11.8 || 8.4 || 20.1 || 2.4 || 2.4 || 5
|-
! scope="row" style="text-align:center" | 1999
|style="text-align:center;"|
| 2 || 22 || 6 || 7 || 235 || 120 || 355 || 72 || 50 || 0.3 || 0.3 || 10.7 || 5.5 || 16.1 || 3.3 || 2.3 || 2
|- style="background-color: #EAEAEA"
! scope="row" style="text-align:center" | 2000
|style="text-align:center;"|
| 2 || 20 || 4 || 4 || 297 || 188 || 485 || 78 || 56 || 0.2 || 0.2 || 14.9 || 9.4 || 24.3 || 3.9 || 2.8 || 13
|-
! scope="row" style="text-align:center" | 2001
|style="text-align:center;"|
| 2 || 8 || 2 || 1 || 60 || 30 || 90 || 15 || 9 || 0.3 || 0.1 || 7.5 || 3.8 || 11.3 || 1.9 || 1.1 || 0
|- class="sortbottom"
! colspan=3| Career
! 243
! 117
! 91
! 3082
! 1819
! 4901
! 763
! 630
! 0.5
! 0.4
! 12.7
! 7.5
! 20.2
! 3.1
! 2.6
! 53
|}

Honours and achievements
Team
 2× AFL premiership player: 1992, 1994
 2× McClelland Trophy: 1991, 1994

Individual
 Norm Smith Medal: 1994
 West Coast Captain: 2001 (co-captain with Ben Cousins)
 West Coast Club Champion: 1992
 All-Australian team: 1992
 2× State of Origin (Western Australia): 1991, 1992
 Glendinning–Allan Medal: 1997 (Round 18)
 Subiaco Team of the Century (Selected in 2008) – Wing
 Australian Football Hall of Fame - 2007 Inductee

References

External links

1969 births
Living people
West Coast Eagles players
West Coast Eagles Premiership players
Subiaco Football Club players
Norm Smith Medal winners
All-Australians (AFL)
John Worsfold Medal winners
Kalgoorlie Railways Football Club players
Australian Football Hall of Fame inductees
Australian rules footballers from Western Australia
West Australian Football Hall of Fame inductees
People from Kalgoorlie
Western Australian State of Origin players
Two-time VFL/AFL Premiership players